Neocurtilla hexadactyla, commonly known as the northern mole cricket, is a species of mole cricket that is native to eastern North America. It also occurs in South America, where it may be an adventive species. Its range extends from the southern reaches of eastern Canada and through the eastern and central United States.

References

Gryllotalpidae
Orthoptera of North America
Fauna of the United States
Fauna without expected TNC conservation status